Phil Sharp (born 11 May 1981) is a British yachtsman. He was born in Jersey (Channel Islands), educated at Victoria College Jersey and qualified from Imperial College London with an MSc in Mechanical Engineering. Sharp holds World Speed Sailing Records. and Guinness World Records for the Cowes-to-Dinard monohull under 60 ft singlehanded (set in 2016), and crewed around Britain and Ireland under 40 ft (set in 2018).

Biography 
Racing a 2013 Manuard Mach 2 design under the name Imerys Clean Energy, Sharp won the Class40 ocean racing Championship in 2017 and 2018 with title sponsor Imerys.

In 2006, Sharp won the Route du Rhum single-handed race from St Malo, Brittany, to Guadeloupe aboard a Class40 and is entered for the 2018 edition. In 2016, Sharp lost his lead in the single-handed in the Transat Bakerly (Plymouth, UK – New York, US) after his mainsail shredded in a storm. Sharp made a temporary repair and finished the race in 3rd place.

Sharp is a mechanical engineering specialist in high-performance composite structural design. He engineered a  wind turbine through his time at Blade Dynamics on the Isle of Wight and three carbon-fibre booms at Future Fibres in Valencia, Spain. In 2018 Sharp co-founded Genevos in La Rochelle to develop and commercialise marine fuel cells to decarbonise vessels with green hydrogen.

Sharp is a member of the Royal Cruising Club and Royal Channel Islands Yacht Club. He is a founder of PS Racing Ltd, a sports-management company which operates OceansLab - Race to Zero Emissions. A key campaign objective is to compete in the Everest of Sailing, the Vendee Globe solo, non-stop, around the world race, whilst being powered by wind and a Genevos Hydrogen Power Module.

Records 

 2019: Monohull (40 ft and single-handed) for Around the Isle of Wight.
 2018: Monohull (crewed, up to 40 feet) for the Round Britain and Ireland.
 2016: Monohull and multihull (single-handed up to 60 feet) for the Channel (Cowes, Isle of Wight – Dinard, Brittany).

References

External links 
 
 

1981 births
Living people
English male sailors (sport)